|}

The Prix du Pin is a Group 3 flat horse race in France open to thoroughbreds aged three years or older. It is run at Longchamp over a distance of 1,400 metres (about 7 furlongs), and it is scheduled to take place each year in September.

History
The event takes its name from France's oldest horse breeding establishment, located at Le Pin-au-Haras in Orne. The stud farm's construction was authorised by Louis XIV in 1715, and the first horses it accommodated were transferred from the previous Royal Stud at Saint-Léger-en-Yvelines in 1717.

The Prix du Pin was introduced at Chantilly in 1883. It was run over 3,000 metres in late October, and was initially designed to test the aptitudes of horses for carrying unusually high weights. The burden for four-year-olds was 78½ kg (173 lb), while that for older horses was 80 kg (176 lb). It was cut to 2,000 metres in 1904.

The event was cancelled in 1906 as an indirect result of public disorder at Longchamp. Three meetings were switched to Chantilly, and to make way for the extra races the Prix du Pin was dropped. It was moved to Longchamp and restored to 3,000 metres the following year. It was abandoned throughout World War I, with no running from 1914 to 1918.

The original conditions were maintained until 1928. From this point the basic weight for horses aged four or older was 60 kg (132 lb). The race was cancelled twice during World War II, in 1939 and 1940. It was held at Maisons-Laffitte in 1943 and Le Tremblay in 1944.

The distance of the Prix du Pin remained at 3,000 metres until 1949. It was subsequently contested over 2,500 metres (1950–51), 1,850 metres (1952–55), 2,600 metres (1956) and 2,000 metres (1957–59). In the 1960s, it was run over 1,850 metres (1960–61), 2,100 metres (1962–63), 2,000 metres (1964) and 1,800 metres (1965–69). It was shortened to 1,400 metres in 1970.

For a period the Prix du Pin held Listed status. It was promoted to Group 3 level in 2004.

Records
Most successful horse (2 wins):
 Mamiano – 1895, 1896
 Porthos – 1935, 1937
 Kaldoun – 1978, 1979

Leading jockey (5 wins):
 Christophe Soumillon – Sahpresa	(2010), Taniyar (2015), Jallota (2016), City Light (2019), Sagamiyra (2021)

Leading trainer (7 wins):
 Criquette Head-Maarek – Made of Pearl (1986), Bitooh (1988), Malaspina (1989), Neverneyev (1994), Vert Val (1997), Midnight Foxtrot (1999), Etoile Montante (2003)

Leading owner (5 wins):
 Daniel Wildenstein – Perpetual (1969), Johannesburg (1974), Nurabad (1976), Poplar Bluff (1995), Alamo Bay (1998)
 Aga Khan IV – Kaldoun (1978, 1979), Zarannda (1996), Taniyar (2015), Sagamiyra (2021)

Winners since 1978

 Keos finished first in 1997, but he was relegated to third place following a stewards' inquiry.

 The 2016 & 2017 runnings took place at Chantilly while Longchamp was closed for redevelopment.

Earlier winners

 1883: Athala
 1884: Louis d'Or
 1885: Fra Diavolo
 1886: Barberine
 1887: Presta
 1888: Bavarde
 1889: Bocage
 1890: Barberousse
 1891: Le Glorieux
 1892: Fitz Roya
 1893: Avoir
 1894: Boissiere
 1895: Mamiano
 1896: Mamiano
 1897: Champaubert
 1898: General Albert
 1899: Cazabat
 1900: Fourire
 1901: Ivoire
 1902: La Camargo
 1903: Exema
 1904: Hebron
 1905: Presto
 1906: no race
 1907: Moulins la Marche
 1908: L'Inconnu
 1909: Chatou
 1910: Ronde de Nuit
 1911: Cadet Roussel
 1912: Philippe
 1913: Afgar
 1914–18: no race
 1919: Marmouset
 1920: Simpri
 1921: As des As
 1922: Bassan
 1923: Bolet Satan
 1924: Quinze Mille
 1925: Catalin
 1926: Winner
 1927: Wonderful
 1928: Philemon
 1929: Mondovi / Suzerain *
 1930: Nil
 1931: Burlington Arcade
 1932: Rhone
 1933: Barneveldt
 1934: Gracchus
 1935: Porthos
 1936: Son in Love
 1937: Porthos
 1938: Vent du Nord
 1939–40: no race
 1941: Chambord
 1942: Threw
 1943: Kilbiri
 1944: Garde a Vous
 1945: Derio / Esope *
 1946:
 1947:
 1948: Diable Gris
 1949: Finaud
 1950: Petite Main
 1951: Templier
 1952: Minoutchehr
 1953:
 1954: Damelot
 1955: Hathor
 1956: Valcares
 1957: Chippendale
 1958:
 1959: Theodebert
 1960:
 1961: Succes
 1962: Esmar
 1963:
 1964: Aravios
 1965: Le Fabuleux
 1966:
 1967: Adjar
 1968: Iranovo
 1969: Perpetual
 1970: Moi Meme
 1971:
 1972:
 1973:
 1974: Johannesburg
 1975: Northern Taste
 1976: Nurabad
 1977:

* The 1929 and 1945 races were dead-heats and have joint winners.

See also
 List of French flat horse races

References

 France Galop / Racing Post:

 france-galop.com – A Brief History: Prix du Pin.
 galopp-sieger.de – Prix du Pin.
 horseracingintfed.com – International Federation of Horseracing Authorities – Prix du Pin (2016).
 pedigreequery.com – Prix du Pin – Longchamp.

Open mile category horse races
Longchamp Racecourse
Horse races in France
Recurring sporting events established in 1883
1883 establishments in France